Kjeld Vibe (5 October 1927 – 27 January 2011) was a Norwegian diplomat.

Born in Stavanger, and was a cand.jur. by education. He started working for the Norwegian Ministry of Foreign Affairs in 1955, and served as embassy counsellor in the United States from 1965 to 1969, before becoming sub-director in the Ministry of Foreign Affairs. He was promoted to deputy under-secretary of state in 1972, served as NATO ambassador from 1977 to 1984, then five years as permanent under-secretary of state. From 1989 to 1996 he was the Norwegian ambassador to the United States. He was decorated as a Commander with Star of the Order of St. Olav in 1985.

References

1927 births
2011 deaths
People from Stavanger
Norwegian civil servants
Ambassadors of Norway to the United States
Permanent Representatives of Norway to NATO
Norwegian expatriates in the United States